Qaraçanlı or Karachanly or Karadzhanly may refer to:

 Aşağı Qaraçanlı, Kalbajar, Azerbaijan
 Baş Qaraçanlı, Kalbajar, Azerbaijan
 Orta Qaraçanlı, Kalbajar, Azerbaijan
 Mozqaraçanlı, Kalbajar, Azerbaijan

 Qaraçanlı, Lachin, Azerbaijan